Wakatenryū Yuzo (born 1 January 1940 as Tatsuo Nakagawa) is a former sumo wrestler from Kyōto, Japan. He made his professional debut in March 1955 and reached the top division in September 1961. His highest rank was maegashira 1. He left the sumo world upon retirement from active competition in July 1969.

Career record
The Kyushu tournament was first held in 1957, and the Nagoya tournament in 1958.

See also
Glossary of sumo terms
List of past sumo wrestlers
List of sumo tournament second division champions

References

1940 births
Living people
Japanese sumo wrestlers
Sumo people from Kyoto Prefecture